Diospyros thwaitesii, is a tree in the ebony family, endemic to Sri Lanka.

External resources
 http://plants.jstor.org/specimen/k000792434?history=true

thwaitesii
Flora of Sri Lanka